Gregg S. Fisher, CFA, is an American investment manager. In 2019, he founded Quent Capital and serves as Portfolio Manager for the asset management firm which features a global small company long/short equity investment strategy. He was also the Founder and Head of Quantitative Research and Portfolio Strategy of Gerstein Fisher, an investment management and advisory firm that became part of People’s United Bank in 2016.

Early life and education
Fisher was raised by his father, a men’s clothing store owner, in a Jewish family in Queens, New York. He holds a degree in finance from the University at Buffalo, earned a CFA designation, obtained a certificate in financial planning from New York University and studied at Harvard Business School.

Investment career
Fisher founded quantitative investment firm Gerstein Fisher in 1993. By 2006, he had become one of the first investment managers to offer factor investing. From 2010 to 2014, Fisher launched factor-based mutual funds in the global growth equity and real estate investment trust (REIT) categories.

Fisher collaborates on research with academics including Sheridan Titman. He founded the Gerstein Fisher Research Center in 2009. Some of Fisher’s largest contributions to investment science include conducting research that quantifies the value-add of the investment advisor, replicates hedge fund returns through more liquid, transparent investment strategies, and quantifies the excess returns attributable to the small country factor.

In 2016, with over $3 billion in assets under management, Fisher sold Gerstein Fisher to People’s United Bank, expanding the bank into quantitative investing and becoming Lead Portfolio Manager, Head of Quantitative Research and Portfolio Strategy for their investment division.

In 2018, Fisher was named to the University at Buffalo's board of trustees and is now Chair of the endowment. Through his substantial financial contributions, Fisher established the Fisher Research Collaborative in the University at Buffalo School of Management to encourage multidisciplinary research collaboration, in part by providing students and faculty access to essential sources of data and analytics.

In 2018, Fisher began hosting a podcast, The Q Factor with Gregg Fisher, exploring with leading thinkers from various fields how quantitative data is reshaping all corners of our world.

In 2018, Fisher launched a family office for his personal family assets. In 2019, he launched Quent Capital, an asset management firm focused on global innovation.

Selected publications
 "Should You Tilt Your Equity Portfolio to Smaller Countries?" with Ronnie Shah and Sheridan Titman, Journal of Portfolio Management, Vol. 44, No 4 (Fall, 2017)
 "Combining Value and Momentum" with Ronnie Shah and Sheridan Titman, Journal of Investment Management, Vol. 14, No. 2 (2016) 
"Risk Parity Optimality" with Philip Z. Maymin and Zakhar G. Maymin, The Journal of Portfolio Management, Vol. 41, No. 2 (Winter 2015)
 "Decomposing Fundamental Indexation" with Ronnie Shah and Sheridan Titman, The Journal of Index Investing, Vol. 6, No. 3 (Winter 2015)
 "Momentum's Hidden Sensitivity to the Starting Day" with Philip Z. Maymin and Zakhar G. Maymin, The Journal of Investing, Vol. 23, No. 2 (Summer 2014)
 "Send in the Clones? Hedge Fund Replication Using Futures Contracts" with Nicolas P.B. Bollen, The Journal of Alternative Investments, Vol. 16, No. 2 (Fall 2013)
 "Preventing Emotional Investing: An Added Value of an Investment Advisor" with Philip Z. Maymin, The Journal of Wealth Management, Vol. 13, No. 4 (Spring 2011
 "Past Performance is Indicative of Future Beliefs", with Philip Z. Maymin, Risk and Decision Analysis 2 (2010/2011)
 “Advising the Behavioral Investor: Lessons from the Real World,” in Investor Behavior: The Psychology of Financial Planning and Investing, edited by H. Kent Baker and Victor Ricciardi, Wiley Finance (2014)

Personal life
Fisher lives with his wife and their two children in Scarsdale, New York. Fisher is an avid, lifelong drummer, which Barron's explains "tickles the math area of his brain". Fisher taught drumming to his son (Joshua).

See also
List of University at Buffalo people

References

External links
Quent Capital

Year of birth missing (living people)
Living people
CFA charterholders
University at Buffalo alumni
American money managers
Harvard Business School alumni
Businesspeople from New York (state)
American company founders
New York University alumni